Celje is the fourth-largest city in Slovenia. It is a regional center of the traditional Slovenian region of Styria and the administrative seat of the City Municipality of Celje. The town of Celje is located below Upper Celje Castle at the confluence of the Savinja, Hudinja, Ložnica, and Voglajna rivers in the lower Savinja Valley, and at the crossing of the roads connecting Ljubljana, Maribor, Velenje, and the Central Sava Valley.

Name
Celje was known as Celeia during the Roman period. Early attestations of the name during or following Slavic settlement include Cylia in 452, ecclesiae Celejanae in 579, Zellia in 824, in Cilia in 1310, Cilli in 1311, and Celee in 1575. The proto-Slovene name *Ceľe or *Celьje, from which modern Slovene Celje developed, was borrowed from Vulgar Latin Celeae. The name is of pre-Roman origin and its further etymology is unclear. In the local Slovene dialect, Celje is called Cjele or Cele. In German it is called Cilli, and it is known in Italian as Cilli or Celie.

History

Early history
The first settlement in the area of Celje appeared during the Hallstatt era. The settlement was known in the Celtic times and to Ancient Greek historians as Kelea; findings suggest that Celts coined Noric money in the region.

Once the area was incorporated in the Roman Empire in 15 BC, it was known as Civitas Celeia. It received municipal rights in AD 45 under the name municipium Claudia Celeia during the reign of the Roman Emperor Claudius (41–54). Records suggest that the town was rich and densely populated, secured with the walls and towers, containing multi-storied marble palaces, wide squares, and streets. It was called Troia secunda, the second; or small Troy. A Roman road through Celeia led from Aquileia (Sln. Oglej) to Pannonia. Celeia soon became a flourishing Roman colony, and many great buildings were constructed, such as the temple of Mars, which was known across the Empire. Celeia was incorporated into Aquileia c. 320 under the Roman Emperor Constantine I (272–337).

The city was razed by Slavic tribes during the Migration period of the 5th and 6th centuries, but was rebuilt in the Early Middle Ages. The first mention of Celje in the Middle Ages was under the name of Cylie in Wolfhold von Admont's Chronicle, which was written between 1122 and 1137. The town was the seat of the Counts of Celje from 1341 to 1456, with princely status from 1436. It acquired market-town status in the first half of the 14th century and town privileges from Count Frederick II on 11 April 1451.

After the Counts of Celje died out in 1456, the region was inherited by the Habsburgs of Austria and administered by the Duchy of Styria. The city walls and defensive moat were built in 1473. The town defended itself against Turks and in 1515 during great Slovene peasant revolt against peasants, who had taken Old Castle.

Many local nobles converted to Protestantism during the Protestant Reformation, but the region was converted back to Roman Catholicism during the Counter-Reformation. Celje became part of the Habsburgs' Austrian Empire during the Napoleonic Wars. In 1867, after the defeat of Austria in the Austro-Prussian War, the town became part of Austria-Hungary.

19th century
The first service on the Vienna-Trieste railway line came through Celje on 27 April 1846. In 1895, Celje secondary school, established in 1808, began to teach in Slovene.

At the end of the 19th century and in the early 20th century, Celje was a center of German nationalism which had repercussions for Slovenes. The 1910 census showed that 66.8% of the population was German. A symbol of this was the German Cultural Center, built in 1906 and opened on 15 May 1907, today it is Celje Hall. The centuries-old German name of the town, Cilli, sounded no longer German enough to some German residents, the form Celle being preferred by many.

Population growth was steady during this period. In 1900, Celje had 6,743 inhabitants and by 1924 this had grown to 7,750. The National Hall (Narodni dom), which hosts the Mayors Office and Town Council today, was built in 1896. The first telephone line was installed in 1902 and the city received electric power in 1913.

Slovene and German ethnic nationalism increased during the 19th and early 20th centuries. With the collapse of Austria-Hungary in 1918 as a result of World War I, Celje became part of the Kingdom of Serbs, Croats and Slovenes (later known as Yugoslavia). During this period, the town experienced a rapid industrialization and a substantial growth in population.

Second World War
Celje was occupied by Nazi Germany in April 1941. The Gestapo arrived in Celje on 16 April 1941 and were followed three days later by SS leader Heinrich Himmler, who inspected Stari pisker prison. During the war the city suffered from allied bombing, aimed at important communication lines and military installations. The National Hall was severely damaged.

The toll of the war on the city was heavy. The city (including nearby towns) had a pre-war population of 20,000 and lost 575 people during the war, mostly between the ages of 20 and 30. More than 1,500 people were deported to Serbia or into the German interior of the Third Reich. Around 300 people were interned and around 1,000 people imprisoned in Celje's prisons. An unknown number of citizens were forcibly conscripted into the German army. Around 600 "stolen children" were taken to Nazi Germany for Germanization. A monument in Celje called Vojna in mir (War and Peace) by the sculptor Jakob Savinšek, commemorates the World War II era.

After the end of the war, the remaining German-speaking portion of the populace was expelled. Anti-tank trenches and other sites were used to create 25 mass graves in Celje and its immediate surroundings and were filled with Croatian, Serbian, and Slovenian militia members that had collaborated with the Germans, as well as ethnic German civilians from Celje and surrounding areas.

Independent Slovenia
Celje became part of independent Slovenia following the Ten-Day War in 1991. On 7 April 2006, Celje became the seat of a new Diocese of Celje, created by Pope Benedict XVI within the Archdiocese of Maribor.

Sights
The town's tourist sights include a Grayfriars' monastery founded in 1241 and a palace from the 16th century.

The parish church, dating from the 14th century, with its beautiful Gothic chapel, is an interesting specimen of medieval architecture. The so-called German church, in Romanesque style, belonged to the monastery, which was closed in 1808. The throne of the counts of Cilli is preserved here, and also the tombs of several members of the family.

Geography

Climate 
Celje has a warm-summer humid continental climate (Köppen climate classification Dfb).

Symbols

The coat of arms of Celje are based on the coat of arms of the Counts of Celje.

The coat-of-arms of Celje was selected for the national arms immediately after World War I in 1918, when Slovenia together with Croatia and Serbia formed the original Kingdom of Serbs, Croats and Slovenes (later Yugoslavia). A similar coat of arms was integrated into the Slovenian national arms in 1991.

Districts and local communities
The city of Celje is divided into 10 districts (mestne četrti) and the municipality 9 local communities (krajevne skupnosti):

Districts
 Center
 Dečkovo Naselje
 Dolgo Polje
 Gaberje
 Hudinja
 Karel Destovnik Kajuh
 Lava
 Nova Vas
 Savinja
 Slavko Šlander

Local communities
 Aljažev Hrib
 Ljubečna
 Medlog
 Ostrožno
 Pod Gradom
 Škofja Vas
 Šmartno v Rožni Dolini
 Teharje
 Trnovlje

Demographics

In 1991 the population consisted of:
 Slovenians: 33,434 (82.1%)
 Serbs: 1,864 (4.6%)
 Croats: 1,687 (4.1%)
 ethnic Muslims: 466 (1.1%)
 Yugoslavs: 405 (1%)
 Albanians: 189
 Macedonians: 140
 Montenegrins: 93
 Hungarians: 41
 Others: 82
 Unknown: 1,972 (4.8%)
 Undeclared: 249
 Regionally declared: 88

Town of Celje has 37,490 citizens as of 2002:
Municipality:
 Male: 22,744; 
 Female: 24,816;
 Households: 18,410;
 Mean number of household members: 2.6;
 Apartments: 19,578;
 Buildings with apartments: 8,090.

The Celje annual municipal festival is held on April 11.

Education
Celje does not have its own university, although some college-level education has been established in the city.

 The Faculty of Logistics, formally part of the University of Maribor, was established in Celje in 2005.
 International School for Social and Business Studies
 Faculty of Commercial and Business Sciences
 UP Faculty of Management

Law and government

Mayor 

The current mayor of Celje is Matija Kovač.

Vice mayors 

The current mayors of Celje are Breda Arnšek and Vladimir Ljubek.

Courts
In Celje there are three courts of general jurisdiction:
 Celje Higher Court;
 Celje District Court;
 Celje Local Court.

In addition to that there are also Celje Labour Court for resolving labour law disputes and an external department of Administrative Court for resolving disputes arising from administrative procedures.

Communications

Postal number: SI-3000 (from 1991). (Old one: 63000 (between 1945–1991)).

Twin towns – sister cities
Celje is twinned with

 Budva, Montenegro (1984)
 Ćuprija, Serbia (1966)
 Doboj, Bosnia and Hercegovina (1965)
 Gaziantep, Turkey (2014)
 Grevenbroich, Germany (1986)
 Šabac, Serbia (2012)
 Shchyolkovo, Russia (2017)
 Singen, Germany (1990)
 Sisak, Croatia (1965)
 Slavonski Brod, Croatia (2010)
 Sombor, Serbia (1986)
 Veles, North Macedonia (1979)

Celje also cooperates with Cherepovets in Russia and has informal friedly relations with Graz and Spittal an der Drau in Austria.

Notable people
 Anna of Celje (1381–1416), second wife of Jogaila, king of Poland and grand duke of Lithuania
 Lenore Aubert (1918–1993), Hollywood actress and model
 Barbara of Celje (1390/1395–1451), second wife of Sigismund, Holy Roman Emperor
  (1915–2001), film actress
 Gregor Cankar (born 1975), athlete
 Jolanda Čeplak (born 1976), athlete
 Anica Černej (1900–1944), poet, author, and schoolmistress
 Janez Drnovšek (1950–2008), politician, statesman, and third president of Slovenia
 Janez Drozg (1933–2005), television director
 Dejan Glavnik (born 1975), Slovenian extreme cyclist
  (born 1964), singer
 Bojan Gorišek (born 1962), pianist
 Hermann II of Celje (1365–1435), Count of Celje, Ortenburg and Seger
 Andrej Hieng (1925–2000), writer, playwright, screenwriter and dramaturgist
  (1943–2015), critic, essayist, theatrologist and dramaturgist
 Romana Jordan Cizelj (born 1966), physicist and politician
 Boban Jović (born 1991), footballer
 Jelko Kacin (born 1955), politician
 Alma Karlin (1889–1950), traveller, author, poet, and collector
 Margareta of Celje (1411–1480), noblewoman member of the House of Celje, duchess of Głogów and Ścinawa.
 Margit Korondi (born 1932), gymnast, Olympic champion
  (1937–2012), geophysicist and seismologist
 Janez Lapajne (born 1967), film director
 Marianne Elisabeth Lloyd-Dolbey (1919-1994), personal secretary to the Brunei sultan Omar Ali Saifuddien III
 Janko Orožen (1891–1989), historian, honorary citizen
 Oto Pestner (born 1956), musician and singer
 Milan Pogačnik (born 1946), politician
 Lucija Polavder (born 1984), judoka
  (1914–1947), worker, victim of the communist regime
 Fran Roš (1898–1976), writer, poet, playwright, honorary citizen
 Johann Gabriel Seidl (1804–1875), archeologist, poet, storyteller and dramatist
 Bina Štampe Žmavc (born 1952), poet and author
 Tina Trstenjak (born 1990), judoka, Olympic champion
 Beno Udrih (born 1982), basketball player
 Bogumil Vošnjak (1882–1955), scholar, politician, diplomat
 Urška Žolnir (born 1981), judoka, Olympic champion

Gallery

References

External links
 
 Celje on Geopedia
 
 
 CeljeCafe.com unofficial website 

 
Cities and towns in Styria (Slovenia)
Populated places in the City Municipality of Celje
Noricum